Bolshoye Dityatevo is a rural locality (a village) in Nikolotorzhskoye Rural Settlement, Kirillovsky District, Vologda Oblast, Russia. The population was 8 as of 2002.

Geography 
Bolshoye Dityatevo is located 24 km northeast of Kirillov (the district's administrative centre) by road. Bolshoye Zakozye is the nearest rural locality.

References 

Rural localities in Kirillovsky District